Gustavo Martins de Souza Santos (born 11 August 2002), commonly known as Gustavo Martins, is a Brazilian professional footballer who plays as a centre-back for Campeonato Brasileiro Série A club Grêmio.

Club career

Grêmio
Born in Niterói, Brazil, Gustavo Martins joined the Grêmio's Academy at the age of 16 in 2018.

Career statistics

Club

References

External links

Profile at the Grêmio F.B.P.A. website

2002 births
Living people
Brazilian footballers
Association football defenders
Campeonato Brasileiro Série A players
Grêmio Foot-Ball Porto Alegrense players
Sportspeople from Niterói